Link is a light rail system serving the Seattle metropolitan area and operated by Sound Transit. The network consists of 25 stations on two unconnected lines: nineteen on the 1 Line and six on the T Line in Tacoma. Link stations are located within four cities in King and Pierce counties: fourteen in Seattle, five in Tacoma, two in SeaTac and one in Tukwila. The two lines had a combined average weekday ridership of 82,783 and total ridership of 26 million in 2019, placing it seventh among the busiest light rail systems in the United States. The busiest station by daily ridership is Westlake station in Seattle, while the least busy is Convention Center/South 15th Street station in Tacoma.

The first Link segment began service on August 23, 2003, with the opening of five stations on the  Tacoma Link (now the T Line). The initial,  segment of Central Link (now the 1 Line) with 12 stations was opened from Seattle to Tukwila on July 18, 2009, and was later extended  to the Seattle–Tacoma International Airport on December 19, 2009. The first infill station of the Link system was Commerce Street/South 11th Street station on the T Line, which opened on September 15, 2011. A northern extension to Northgate station with three stations opened on October 2, 2021.

, Sound Transit is building five extensions of the Link network that will open between 2023 and 2025 with 25 stations: the Hilltop Extension of the T Line, opening in 2023 with six stations; the 2 Line with ten stations from Seattle to Bellevue and Redmond on the Eastside, scheduled to open in 2024; the Lynnwood extension of the 1 Line and 2 Line, with four stations opening in 2024; the Federal Way extension of the 1 Line, scheduled to open in 2025 with three stations; and the Downtown Redmond extension of the 2 Line, with two stations opening in 2025. These extensions would add an additional  to the light rail network, carrying an estimated 280,000 daily riders by 2030.

The light rail network will include lines to Ballard and West Seattle in Seattle in 2039 and 2032, respectively; Kirkland and Issaquah on the Eastside in 2044; and extensions to Everett and Tacoma in 2041 and 2032, respectively. Three infill stations in Seattle and Tukwila will also be built as part of the Sound Transit 3 program.

The majority of stations are built at-grade on the surface, with the platform elevated slightly above street level; there are also elevated stations and underground stations that include mezzanines (with the exception of Mount Baker station) with access the platform from the surface as well as ticket vending machines and bicycle facilities. Only three current stations, Angle Lake, Tacoma Dome Station and Tukwila International Boulevard, have public park and rides; planned stations on the suburban extensions of Link will incorporate new or existing park and rides.

All stations include works of public art as part of the "STart" program, which requires one percent of station construction funds go to art installations. The stations are named in accordance to facility naming guidelines that include using surrounding neighborhoods and street names, avoiding words used by existing facility names, and being limited to 30 characters in compliance with the Americans with Disabilities Act. Stations are also required by state law to be identified by simple pictograms, known as "Stellar Connections", that are used in station signage, maps and other printed materials as a wayfinding aid; the icons are composed of points that correspond with local landmarks near Link stations, while also forming a picture that represents the station's identity.

Stations

Stations under construction

, Sound Transit has five light rail projects under construction: the Hilltop Extension in Tacoma, scheduled to open in early 2023 with six new stations and one relocated station on the T Line; the East Link Extension, scheduled to open in 2024 as the 2 Line with ten new stations on the Eastside; the Lynnwood Link Extension, scheduled to open in 2024 or 2025 with four new stations in Shoreline and Snohomish County; the Federal Way Link Extension, scheduled to open in 2025 with three stations on the 1 Line; and the Downtown Redmond Link Extension, scheduled to open in 2025 with two stations in Redmond on the 2 Line.

Planned and funded stations

Other sections of the Sound Transit 2 program, approved by voters in 2008, are anticipated to be complete by 2024.

Deferred and unbuilt stations

Notes

References

External links

Sound Transit website

Transportation in Washington (state)
Sound Transit
Link Light Rail
Lists of railway stations in the United States
Link
Link